The Rouen Philharmonic Orchestra, officially the Orchestra of the Opera of Rouen Normandy (French: Orchestre de l'Opéra de Rouen Normandie), is a symphony orchestra based in Rouen in Normandy, France. It is housed in the Rouen Opera House.

Founded in 1998 by Austrian conductor Oswald Sallaberger, the orchestra is one of France's leading musical institutions. British conductor Leo Hussain was offered the conductorship in 2014.

The Orchestra 

Overview

The Orchestra was formed in 1998 by Oswald Sallaberger in an endeavour to organize a professional orchestra in the city of Rouen.

Based on a Mozart formation, the Orchestra is made up of more than 40 permanent musicians. It is often reinforced by additional non-permanent artists, enriching the breadth of the Orchestra and allowing for special musical programs and events requiring a larger ensemble.

The Orchestra is alternately conducted by its current Musical Director, Leo Hussain, or by local and foreign guest conductors who impulse a continuously renewed and refreshed approach to music.

Repertoire

The orchestra's scope ranges from Baroque music to contemporary music. They notably performed Wagner's Der fliegende Holländer and Britten's Curlew River.

Specificity

The Orchestra also organizes concerts requiring catgut strings instruments and traditional bows, offering musicians the opportunity to fully express their talents. The Orchestra also highly encourages its musicians to further develop their technicality and widen their personal scope by programming concerts of chamber music and allowing them to perform as soloists. It is France's first orchestra to offer that alternative.

International recognition

It holds musical performances worldwide, either in Normandy, in other regions of France or in overseas countries. The Orchestra has toured to cities such as Bruges, Brussels, Dehli, Hanover, Havana, Luxembourg, New York City or Paris. The Orchestra benefits from international recognition and was acclaimed on numerous occasions for the professionalism displayed in its rendition of musical masterpieces.

Musical Direction

Current Directorship 

Leo Hussain was appointed conductor of the orchestra upon the termination of Acocella's contract. The orchestra's founding director, Oswald Sallaberger, is still closely involved in the running of the musical institution.

Former Directors 

 1998–2011 : Oswald Sallaberger – Nationality: Austrian
 2011–2014 : Luciano Acocella – Nationality: Italian

Guest Conductors

Current Guest Conductors 

(Incomplete)

Former Guest Conductors 

 2002–2005 : David Stern, Principal guest conductor – Nationality: American

Musicians

Permanent musicians of the Orchestra 

Violin
 Jane Peters, Leader – Nationality: Australian
 Teona Kharadze, Principal second violin – Nationality: Georgian
 Hervé Walczak Le Sauder, Principal second violin – Nationality: French
 Tristan Benveniste, Co-leader second violin – Nationality: French
 Hélène Bordeaux, Violin – Nationality: French
 Elena Chesneau, Violin – Nationality: Russian
 Nathalie Demarest, Violin
 Alice Estienne-Hotellier, Violin – French
 Etienne Hotellier, Violin – Nationality: French
 Marc Lemaire, Violin – French
 Elena Pease, Violin
 Laurent Soler, Violin – Nationality: French
 Pascale Thiébaux, Violin – Nationality: French

Viola
 Patrick Dussart, Soloist viola
 Agathe Blondel, Soloist Viola – Nationality: French
 Thierry Corbier, Viola – Nationality: French
 Stéphanie Lalizet, Viola – Nationality: French
 Cédric Rousseau, Viola – Nationality: French

Cello
 Florent Audibert, Soloist cello – Nationality: French
 Anaël Rousseau, Soloist cello – Nationality: French
 Jacques Perez, Cello – Nationality: French
 Hélène Latour, Cello – Nationality: French

Bass
 Gwendal Etrillard, Soloist bass – Nationality: French
 Baptiste Andrieu, Bass – Nationality: French

Flute
 Jean-Christophe Falala, Soloist flute – Nationality: French
 Kouchyar Shahroudi, Flute – Nationality: Iranian

Oboe
 Jérôme Laborde, Soloist oboe – Nationality: French
 Fabrice Rousson, Oboe – Nationality: French

Clarinet
 Naoko Yoshimura, Soloist clarinet – Nationality: Japanese
 Florianne Tardy, Clarinet

Bassoon
 Batiste Arcaix, Soloist bassoon – Nationality: French

Horn
 Pierre-Olivier Goll, Soloist horn – Nationality: French
 Eric Lemardeley, Horn – Nationality: French

Trumpet
 Franck Paque, Soloist trumpet – Nationality: French
 Patrice Antonangelo, Trumpet – Nationality: French

Timpani
 Philippe Bajard, Soloist timpani – Nationality: French

Source:

References

External links 
 

French orchestras
Rouen
Musical groups from Normandy